John Leonard Frederick Parslow (1935–2015) was an English ornithologist and author.

Parslow was born on 10 July 1935 in London, and, after wartime evacuation to Cornwall, was educated at Chingford Grammar School. He undertook National Service at RAF Bawdsey, as a radar operator, from which he was demobbed in 1952.

After work in the Bird Room of the British Museum, he joined the Edward Grey Institute of Field Ornithology in 1959, as assistant to David Lack. he moved to the Nature Conservancy Council's Monks Wood Experimental Station in 1967 to work as an information scientist, investigating the effects of pesticides on the food chain of birds. He was the RSPB's Director of Conservation and Reserves from 1975 to 1987.

Parslow did pioneering work on the detection of bird migration using radar. He was also involved in the creation of a bird observatory at St. Agnes on the Isles of Scilly, which operated from 1957 to 1967.

Parslow was the author of several books, a number of papers on bird migration, and a series of articles for British Birds.

He died at home on 23 October 2015, and was buried at the Arbory Trust Woodland Burial Ground in Barton, Cambridgeshire. He was married twice, to Rosemary, with whom he had a son and two daughters, and to Mariko, who survived him.

Bibliography

References 

1935 births
2015 deaths
Place of death missing
English ornithologists
Royal Society for the Protection of Birds people
English nature writers
Scientists from London
Royal Air Force airmen
Edward Grey Institute people